William Ross (December 20, 1824 – March 17, 1912) was a Canadian politician.

Born on Boularderie Island, Nova Scotia, the son of John Ross, a Scottish immigrant, and Robina McKenzie, Ross was a merchant and shipbuilder. In 1855, he married Eliza Moore.  He represented Victoria County in the Nova Scotia House of Assembly from 1857 to 1867. He was elected to the 1st Canadian Parliament in 1867. From 1873 to 1874, he was the Minister of Militia and Defence. Ross resigned his seat in the House of Commons in 1874 after he was named customs collector for Halifax and served until 1888.

Ross also served as a Lieutenant-colonel in the Cape Breton Militia.

In 1905, he was summoned to the Senate of Canada representing the senatorial division of Victoria, Nova Scotia. A Liberal, he served until his death in 1912.

Electoral record

References

1824 births
1912 deaths
Nova Scotia pre-Confederation MLAs
Anti-Confederation Party MPs
Canadian senators from Nova Scotia
Liberal Party of Canada MPs
Liberal Party of Canada senators
Members of the House of Commons of Canada from Nova Scotia

Canadian Militia officers